AQG or aqg may refer to:

 AQG, the IATA code for Anqing Tianzhushan Airport, Anhui, China
 AQG, the Indian Railways station code for Ashapura Gomat railway station, Rajasthan, India
 aqg, the ISO 639-3 code for Akoko language, Nigeria